Gibson C. Armstrong (born 1967 at Marine Corps Air Station Cherry Point) is an American politician. He represented the 100th district from 2002 to 2006 in the Pennsylvania House of Representatives.

Early life and education
He graduated from Lampeter-Strasburg High School, Pennsylvania. He served in the United States Marine Corps for nine years and became a captain. While in the Marine Corps, he attended the College of Naval Command and Staff at the Naval War College, Newport, Rhode Island.

Political career
Armstrong was elected to the Pennsylvania House of Representatives in 2002, defeating John Barley. When Barley resigned, he was elected in a special election on July 16, 2002.

He was a member of the Appropriations Committee, the Environmental Resources and Energy Committee, the Aging and Older Adults Committee, the Transportation Committee and Veterans and Emergency Preparedness Committee.

Armstrong helped draft and sponsor the 16-bill Keystone Manufacturing Initiative that cut business taxes and eliminated school property taxes.

Armstrong ran the Renewable Energy and Environmental Caucus and drafted a fuel standards bill for the Governor's Penn Secure Fuels Initiative. He was also a member of Penn Future.

On the Transportation Committee, Chairman Richard Geist picked Armstrong to run the Aviation Subcommittee and stop the state's $20 million Aviation Trust Fund from losing $1 million annually.

He worked with Katie McGinty to stand up the Pennsylvania Energy Development Authority. He served on the authority until 2019.

In his second term he wrote a resolution to establish the Select Committee on Higher Education. This gave the General Assembly the authority to hold bipartisan hearings on free speech and academic freedom.

References

External links
Pennsylvania House of Representatives - Gibson C. Armstrong official PA House website (archived)
Pennsylvania House Republican Caucus - Representative Gibson C. Armstrong official Party website
Follow the Money - Gibson C. Armstrong
2006 2004 2002 campaign contributions

1967 births
Living people
College of Naval Command and Staff alumni
Republican Party members of the Pennsylvania House of Representatives
United States Naval Academy alumni
United States Marine Corps officers